Liston House was a historic home located at Taylors Bridge, New Castle County, Delaware.  It was built about 1739, and was a two-story, three bay brick dwelling with a gambrel roof.  It had a -story, frame addition.  The house had two end wall chimneys and shed roofed dormers.

It was listed on the National Register of Historic Places in 1973, and demolished before 1991.

References

Houses on the National Register of Historic Places in Delaware
Houses completed in 1739
Houses in New Castle County, Delaware
National Register of Historic Places in New Castle County, Delaware
1739 establishments in the Thirteen Colonies